The 2017 VTV9 - Binh Dien International Women's Volleyball Cup was the 11th staging . The tournament was held in Tây Ninh, Vietnam.

Pools composition

Pool standing procedure
 Number of matches won
 Match points
 Sets ratio
 Points ratio
 Result of the last match between the tied teams

Match won 3–0 or 3–1: 3 match points for the winner, 0 match points for the loser
Match won 3–2: 2 match points for the winner, 1 match point for the loser

Preliminary round
All times are Vietnam Standard Time (UTC+07:00).

Pool A

        

|}

|}

Pool B

        

|}

|}

Classification 5th-8th
All times are Vietnam Standard Time (UTC+07:00).

Classification 5th-8th

|}

7th place

|}

5th place

|}

Final round
All times are Vietnam Standard Time (UTC+07:00).

Semifinals

|}

3rd place match

|}

Final

|}

Final standing

Awards

Most Valuable Player
 Jong Jin Sim (April 25 Sports Club)
Best Setter
  Pornpun Guedpard (Bangkok Glass)
Best Outside Hitters
 Trần Thị Thanh Thúy (VTV Bình Điền Long An)
 Sun Fang Qiong (Yunnan)

Best Middle Blockers
 Pleumjit Thinkaow (Bangkok Glass)
 Nguyễn Thị Ngọc Hoa (VTV Bình Điền Long An)
Best Opposite Spiker
 Nguyễn Thị Ngọc Hoa (VTV Bình Điền Long An)
Best Libero
 Tikamporn Changkeaw (Bangkok Glass)
Best Young Player
 Trần Thị Thanh Thúy (VTV Bình Điền Long An)

See also
VTV9 - Binh Dien International Women's Volleyball Cup

References

External links
vtvbinhdiencup.vn
 volleyball.vn
bongchuyensaigon.vn

VTV9 – Binh Dien International Women's Volleyball Cup
Voll
2017 in women's volleyball